Utkivka is an urban-type settlement in Kharkiv Raion of Kharkiv Oblast in Ukraine. It is located on the left bank of the Mzha, in the drainage basin of the Don. Utkivka belongs to Merefa urban hromada, one of the hromadas of Ukraine. Population:

Economy

Transportation
Utkivka railway station is on the railway connecting Kharkiv and Krasnohrad. There is local passenger traffic.

The settlement has road access to Highway M18 connecting Kharkiv with Dnipro and Zaporizhzhia.

References

Urban-type settlements in Kharkiv Raion